The Ambassador of Australia to Croatia is an officer of the Australian Department of Foreign Affairs and Trade and the head of the Embassy of the Commonwealth of Australia to the Republic of Croatia in Zagreb. The position has the rank and status of an Ambassador Extraordinary and Plenipotentiary and is held by Elizabeth Petrović, since January 2017.

Croatia and Australia have enjoyed official diplomatic relations since 1967, when Australia opened an Embassy to the Socialist Federal Republic of Yugoslavia (which included the Socialist Republic of Croatia) in Belgrade. However, with the breakup of Yugoslavia in the early 1990s, Prime Minister Bob Hawke acted quickly to recognise the newly independent former Yugoslav Republics of Slovenia and Croatia. Australia became one of the first countries to recognise Croatia's independence, on 16 January 1992, and diplomatic relations were established on 13 February 1992, with the Australian Ambassador in Vienna receiving non-resident accreditation as the first Australian Ambassador to Croatia. The first Ambassador, Michael Wilson, presented his credentials to President Franjo Tudjman in March 1992. A resident embassy was not established until October 1999, when the Australian Government appointed Neil Francis as the first Ambassador resident in Zagreb.

The Ambassador of Australia to Croatia currently holds non-residency accreditation as the Ambassador of Australia to Kosovo.

List of ambassadors

Notes
 Also non-resident Australian Ambassador to the Republic of Kosovo, 21 May 2008-present.

See also
Australia-Croatia relations
Australia–Yugoslavia relations
Foreign relations of Australia

References

External links
 Australian Embassy in Zagreb

 
Croatia
Australian